With Us Until You're Dead is the eighth studio album of the London-based trip hop band Archive.

Reception

With Us Until You're Dead received mixed to positive reviews from critics. On Metacritic, the album holds a score of 72/100 based on 4 reviews, indicating "generally favorable reviews".

Track listing
 "Wiped Out" – 6:21 (music: Keeler, Griffiths – lyrics: Griffiths, Keeler)
 "Interlace" – 4:43 (music: Keeler – lyrics: Pen)
 "Stick Me in My Heart" – 3:57 (music: Keeler, Griffiths – lyrics: Griffiths, Berrier)
 "Conflict" – 5:01 (music: Keeler – lyrics: Pen)
 "Violently" – 6:24 (music: Griffiths, Keeler – lyrics: Griffiths, Martin)
 "Calm Now" – 3:53 (Keeler, Griffiths)
 "Silent" – 5:39 (music: Keeler – lyrics: Griffiths, Quintile)
 "Twisting" – 4:02 (music: Keeler – lyrics: Berrier)
 "Things Going Down" – 1:52 (music: Griffiths, Keeler – lyrics: Griffiths, Quintile)
 "Hatchet" – 4:16 (music: Keeler, Griffiths – lyrics: Martin, Griffiths)
 "Damage" – 6:50 (music: Keeler, Griffiths – lyrics: Berrier, Griffiths)
 "Rise" – 2:50 (music: Keeler- lyrics: Pen)
 "Aggravated Twisted Fill (Bonus)" – 3:36 (music: Keeler, Griffiths – lyrics: Griffiths, Berrier)
 "Soul Tired (Bonus)" – 3:51 (music: Griffiths – lyrics: Griffiths, Pen)

Personnel 

 Darius Keeler – Keyboards, piano, electric piano, synthesizers, programmer, arrangements, orchestral arrangements, production
 Danny Griffiths – Keyboards, samples, sound effects, programmer, arrangements, production
 Pollard Berrier – Vocals (tracks 1,3,8,11), rhythm guitar (track 1)
 Dave Pen – Vocals (tracks 2,4,12), rhythm guitar (2,8), percussions
 Maria Quintile – Vocals (tracks 7,9)
 Holly Martin – Vocals (tracks 5,10)
 Steve "Smiley" Barnard – Drums
 Steve Harris – Lead guitar
 Jonathan Noyce – Bass guitar

Charts

Weekly charts

Year-end charts

References

2012 albums
Archive (band) albums